Fearless is Cowboy Mouth's eleventh release and eighth studio album, released September 23, 2008.

Track listing
 "Anything"
 "Belly"
 "Tell the Girl Ur Sorry"
 "I Believe"
 "Kelly Ripa"
 "Kiss da Baby"
 "Outside Looking In"
 "Follow Me"
 "Disconnected"
 "Drown"
 "The Lord Knows I'm Drinkin' "
 "Maureen"
 "Fearless Commercial"

Personnel
Cowboy Mouth
 Fred LeBlanc - drums, lead vocals
 John Thomas Griffith - guitar, vocals
 Regina Zernay - bass guitar, vocals
 Jonathan Pretus - guitar, vocals

References

2008 albums
Cowboy Mouth albums